Molokovo is a rural locality (a village) in Frolovskoye Rural Settlement, Permsky District, Perm Krai, Russia. The population was 29 as of 2010. There are 10 streets.

Geography 
Molokovo is located 31 km southeast of Perm (the district's administrative centre) by road. Simonki is the nearest rural locality.

References 

Rural localities in Permsky District